The APEV Pouchel Classic is a French amateur-built aircraft, designed by Daniel Dalby and produced by APEV of Peynier. The aircraft is supplied as plans or as a kit for amateur construction.

Design and development
The Pouchel Classic is derived from the APEV Pouchel, which is itself a derivative of the classic 1930s Henri Mignet-designed Mignet Pou-du-Ciel (Flying Flea). The design features a cantilever rear wing and a strut-braced front parasol wing, a single-seat open cockpit, fixed conventional landing gear and a single engine in tractor configuration.

The Pouchel Classic differs from the earlier Pouchel in that it has a newly designed wooden fuselage to replace the aluminum ladder and rectangular tube design of the Pouchel and the Pouchel II. The Pouchel Classic's fuselage is also longer. Flying surfaces are covered in Dacron sailcloth. Standard engines recommended are the  Rotax 377 or the  Rotax 447 two-stroke powerplants.

Specifications (Pouchel Classic)

References

External links
Official website

Homebuilt aircraft
Single-engined tractor aircraft
Pouchel Classic
Tandem-wing aircraft